Nicholas Kimon "Nick" Bandurak (born 14 December 1992) is an English field hockey player who plays as a forward for Holcombe and the England and Great Britain national teams.

Club career
Bandurak plays club hockey in the Men's England Hockey League Premier Division for Holcombe alongside his great friends Robert Field, Tom O'Keefe, Hayden Phillips, & Barry Middleton.
He has previously played for Cannock.

International career
Bandurak made his England U-21 debut when he played in the Hero Hockey Junior World Cup Men 2013 in India.
He made his senior England debut v Spain, in the FIH Pro League on 4 February 2022.

Personal life

Marital Status - Emma Bandurak (Trunks). Bandurak has been married to Emma since August 2020 and they have a child named Rolo.

References

External links

Profile on England Hockey

1992 births
Living people
English male field hockey players
British male field hockey players
Male field hockey forwards
Holcombe Hockey Club players
Men's England Hockey League players
Place of birth missing (living people)
2023 Men's FIH Hockey World Cup players